Madurai is a city in the Indian state of Tamil Nadu and administrative headquarters of Madurai District. It is the third largest municipal corporation in Tamil Nadu.

Topology
The average elevation of the city is

Divisions
For the administration purpose the city is divided into four zones by the municipal corporation administration. Madurai East zone, Madurai West zone, Madurai North zone, Madurai South zone.

Climate

Civic amenities
Drinking water for the city is mostly dependent on Vaigai river.